Herman Boyd "Heinie" Odom (October 13, 1900 – August 31, 1970) was an American baseball player.

Odom was born in 1900 in Rusk, Texas. He attended the University of Texas.

He began playing professional baseball in 1925 for the New York Yankees. He played one game for the Yankees on April 22, 1925. He hit a single in his one and only at bat and finished with a perfect 1.000 batting average. In the field, he had one putout and no errors, for a perfect 1.000 fielding percentage. He continued playing professional baseball until 1929, including stints with the St. Paul Saints of the American Association, the Beaumont Exporters of the Texas League, and the Oklahoma City Indians and Denver Bears of the Western League.

After his baseball career ended, he worked as a bookkeeper. He was a lifelong resident of Rusk, Texas. He died in Rusk in 1970 at age 69.

References

1900 births
1970 deaths
Major League Baseball third basemen
New York Yankees players
Baseball players from Texas
University of Texas at Austin alumni
People from Rusk, Texas
Texas Longhorns baseball players